PDES may refer to:

ISO 10303 - an international standard resulting from the Product Data Exchange Specification effort
Partial differential equations
Party for Economic Development and Solidarity
Process Development Execution System -- systems supporting the execution of high-tech manufacturing process developments